Not related to actor-singer Ray Linn Jr. (1914–1994).

Ray Linn (October 20, 1920 in Chicago, Illinois – 4 November 1996 in Columbus, Ohio) was an American jazz trumpeter.

Linn's first major engagements came in the late 1930s, playing with Tommy Dorsey (1938–41) and Woody Herman (1941-42). He would return to play with Herman again several times, in 1945, 1947, and 1955–59. In the 1940s he spent time with Jimmy Dorsey (1942–45), Benny Goodman (1943, 1947), Artie Shaw (1944–46), and Boyd Raeburn (1946). He moved to Los Angeles in 1945, where he worked extensively as a studio musician, in addition to playing with Bob Crosby (1950–51) and his extended final tenure with Herman. He spent much of the 1960s playing music for television, including The Lawrence Welk Show.

Linn recorded eight tunes as a leader in 1946, and full-length albums in 1978 and 1980, the latter of which are Dixieland jazz efforts.

Discography

As leader
 Chicago Jazz (Trend, 1978)
 Empty Suit Blues (Discovery, 1980)

As sideman
With Georgie Auld
In the Land of Hi-Fi with Georgie Auld and His Orchestra (EmArcy, 1955)
With Chet Baker and Bud Shank
Theme Music from "The James Dean Story" (World Pacific, 1956)
With Louis Bellson
Skin Deep (Norgran, 1953) 
With Elmer Bernstein
"The Man with the Golden Arm" (Decca, 1956)
With Buddy Bregman
Swinging Kicks (Verve, 1957)
With Hoagy Carmichael
Hoagy Sings Carmichael (Pacific Jazz, 1956)
With Maynard Ferguson
Around the Horn with Maynard Ferguson (EmArcy, 1956)
With Barney Kessel
Carmen (Contemporary, 1959)
With Pete Rugolo
Music for Hi-Fi Bugs (EmArcy, 1956)
Out on a Limb (EmArcy, 1956)
An Adventure in Sound: Brass in Hi-Fi (Mercury 1956 [1958])
The Music from Richard Diamond (EmArcy, 1959)

References
Scott Yanow, [ Ray Linn] at Allmusic

External links
 Ray Linn recordings at the Discography of American Historical Recordings.

1920 births
1996 deaths
American jazz trumpeters
American male trumpeters
Musicians from Chicago
20th-century American musicians
Lawrence Welk
20th-century trumpeters
Jazz musicians from Illinois
American male jazz musicians
Earle Spencer Orchestra members
20th-century American male musicians